Markaziy Stadium is a multi-use stadium in Kosonsoy, Uzbekistan.  It is currently used mostly for football matches and is the home stadium of FK Kasansay.  The stadium holds 30,000 people.  

Football venues in Uzbekistan